Beef kway teow or beef kwetiau is a Maritime Southeast Asian dish of flat rice noodles (kway teow) stir-fried and topped with slices of beef or sometimes beef offal, served either dry or with soup. The dish is commonly found in Southeast Asian countries, especially Singapore and  Indonesia, and can trace its origin to Chinese tradition. It is a popular dish in Singaporean cuisine and among Chinese Indonesians, where it locally known in Indonesian as kwetiau sapi.

Variants
Technically, all kway teow (flat rice noodles) stir fried with beef can be categorized as beef kway teow. As the result, there are various recipes of beef kway teow exist.

Singapore
In Singapore, traditionally, beef extract was added to the stock, and the soup enhanced with gula melaka and lengkuas (galangal or blue ginger). However, the dry version of beef kway teow is mixed with sesame oil, soy sauce and chilli; thick gravy is not usually served in this version.

Indonesia
In Indonesia, kwetiau sapi is a popular Chinese Indonesian dish. Kwetiau with beef is known in three variants; kwetiau siram sapi (poured upon), kwetiau goreng sapi (stir fried), and kwetiau bun sapi (a rather moist version). The kwetiau siram sapi is a kwetiau noodle poured (Indonesian: siram) with beef in thick flavorful sauce. The beef sauce has thick and rather gloppy glue-like consistency acquired from corn starch as thickening agent. The kwetiau goreng sapi is a variant of popular kwetiau goreng (stir fried kway teow) but distinctly served with beef. While the kwetiau bun sapi is similar to common fried kwetiau but rather moist and soft due to water addition.

The common ingredients are flat rice noodles (kwetiau), thin slices of beef tenderloin, garlic, sliced bakso meatballs, caisim, napa cabbage, oyster sauce, beef stock, soy sauce, black pepper, sugar, corn starch, and cooking oil.

See also 

 Kwetiau goreng
 Char kway teow
 Beef chow fun
 Chinese Indonesian cuisine
 Rice noodles

References

Indonesian Chinese cuisine
Singaporean noodle dishes